The 2011 Fayetteville mayoral election took place on November 8, 2011, to elect the mayor of Fayetteville, North Carolina. It saw the reelection of incumbent mayor Tony Chavonne.

Results

Primary
The primary was held October 8, 2011.

General election

References

2011
2011 North Carolina elections
2011 United States mayoral elections